This is a list of the origins of the names of states and union territories of India.

States

Union territories

Andaman and Nicobar Islands (A):
 Andaman: Italian traveler Niccolò de' Conti (c. 1440) mentioned the word Andaman meant "Island of Gold". A theory that became prevalent in the late 19th century and has since gained momentum is that the name of the islands derives from Sanskrit via the Malay , named for the Hindu deity Hanuman.
 Nicobar: The name "Nicobar" is probably derived from the Chola dynasty name for the islands, nakkavaram (literally, "naked man" in Tamil) which is inscribed on a Tanjore inscription of 1050 CE.
Chandigarh (B): "Chandi's fort" in Hindi. Although, no actual fort ever existed but according to legends, a large Chandi temple protected the locals, hence the name. The goddess Chandi appears as a form of the goddess Kali or Parvati.
Dadra and Nagar Haveli and Daman and Diu (C): From the towns of Dadra, Nagar Haveli, Daman and Diu.
Jammu and Kashmir (D):
Jammu: From the name of King Jambu Lochan.
Kashmir: After Vedic sage Kashyapa.
Ladakh (E): Ladakh ("la-dvags") means "land of high passes" in Tibetan. Ladak is its pronunciation in several Tibetan dialects, and Ladakh is a transliteration of the Persian spelling.
Lakshadweep (F): "Hundred Thousand Islands". In Sanskrit, lakṣa means "a hundred thousand" and dvīpa means "island".
National Capital Territory of Delhi (G): The etymology of "Delhi" is uncertain. The very common view is that its eponym is Dhillu or Dilu, a king of the Mauryan dynasty, who built the city in 50 BC and named it after himself. The Hindi/Prakrit word ḍhīlī ("loose") was used by the Tomaras to refer to the city because the Iron Pillar built by Raja Dhava had a weak foundation and was replaced. Coins in circulation in the region under the Tomaras were called dehlīwāl. Some other historians believe that the name is derived from Dillī, a corruption of dehlīz or dehalī. Both terms mean "threshold" or "gateway" and are symbolic of the city as a gateway to the Gangetic Plain. Another theory suggests that the city's original name was Dhillika.

Puducherry (H): From Puducheri in Tamil; pudu ("new") + ceri ("settlement" or "camp").

References 

India
Lists of subdivisions of India
India
State